Alun Lewis Bennett  (born 1949) is a British former actor, best known for his roles in ITV's Emmerdale as postmaster Vic Windsor, and Darryl Stubbs in BBC1 sitcom Birds of a Feather from 1989 to 1994.

Together with Emmerdale co-stars Steve Halliwell and Billy Hartman, he was a member of UK 1990s country rock trio The Woolpackers who had a UK hit single "Hillbilly Rock Hillbilly Roll" in November 1996.

Personal life 
He was born in London, the son of Welsh parents Sarah Gwen (née Lewis) and Gorden Bennett. He appeared with the National Youth Theatre in Zigger Zagger at the Strand Theatre in the West End in March 1968. After training as an actor at RADA, in 1979 he appeared in the humorous film Le Pétomane.

He is the brother of actor Hywel Bennett, who played many roles in British film and television. His daughter, by his former wife Annette Ekblom, is composer Amelia Warner.

Television
Beryl's Lot (1977)
Rising Damp (1978)
Noah's Castle (1979)
The Professionals as CI5 agent McCabe in episode The Acorn Syndrome 1979
Minder as Jim in episode "Whose Wife is it Anyway?" (1980)
Ennal's Point (1982)
Boon (1987)
The Bill (1989)
Birds of a Feather (1989–1994)
Rumpole of the Bailey (1991)
Emmerdale (1993–1998)
Lexx (2001)
The Watcher in the Woods (2017)

References

External links

Living people
English male television actors
English people of Welsh descent
1949 births